Hypereosinophilic syndrome  is a disease characterized by a persistently elevated eosinophil count (≥ 1500 eosinophils/mm³) in the blood for at least six months without any recognizable cause, with involvement of either the heart, nervous system, or bone marrow.

HES is a diagnosis of exclusion, after clonal eosinophilia (such as FIP1L1-PDGFRA-fusion induced hypereosinophelia and leukemia) and reactive eosinophilia (in response to infection, autoimmune disease, atopy, hypoadrenalism, tropical eosinophilia, or cancer) have been ruled out.

There are some associations with chronic eosinophilic leukemia as it shows similar characteristics and genetic defects.
If left untreated, HES is progressive and fatal. It is treated with glucocorticoids such as prednisone. The addition of the monoclonal antibody mepolizumab may reduce the dose of glucocorticoids.

Signs and symptoms
As HES affects many organs at the same time, symptoms may be numerous. Some possible symptoms a patient may present with include:
Cardiomyopathy
Skin lesions
Thromboembolic disease
Pulmonary disease
Neuropathy
Hepatosplenomegaly
Reduced ventricular size
 Atopic eczema

Diagnosis
Numerous techniques are used to diagnose hypereosinophilic syndrome, of which the most important is blood testing. In HES, the eosinophil count is greater than 1.5 × 109/L. On some smears the eosinophils may appear normal in appearance, but morphologic abnormalities, such as a lowering of granule numbers and size, can be observed. Roughly 50% of patients with HES also have anaemia.

Secondly, various imaging and diagnostic technological methods are utilised to detect defects to the heart and other organs, such as valvular dysfunction and arrhythmias by means of echocardiography. Chest radiographs may indicate pleural effusions and/or fibrosis, and neurological tests such as CT scans can show strokes and increased cerebrospinal fluid pressure.

A proportion of patients have a mutation involving the PDGFRA and FIP1L1 genes on the fourth chromosome, leading to a tyrosine kinase fusion protein. Testing for this mutation is now routine practice, as its presence indicates a likely response to imatinib, a tyrosine kinase inhibitor.

Treatment
Treatment primarily consists of reducing eosinophil levels and preventing further damage to organs. Corticosteroids, such as prednisone, are good for reducing eosinophil levels and antineoplastics are useful for slowing eosinophil production. Surgical therapy is rarely utilised, however splenectomy can reduce the pain due to spleen enlargement. If the heart has been damaged (in particular the valves), prosthetic valves can replace the current organic ones. Follow-up care is vital for the survival of the patient; as such, the patient should be checked for any signs of deterioration regularly.

Many cases of hypereosinophilic syndrome may be treated exclusively with monoclonal antibodies such as mepolizumab It may then be typical not to prescribe corticosteroids for this condition, reducing the burden of the side effects associated with corticosteroids.

Epidemiology
The European Medicines Agency (EMA) estimated the prevalence of HES at the time of granting orphan drug designation for HES in 2004 at 1.5 in 100,000 people, corresponding to a current case load of about 8,000 in the EU, 5,000 in the U.S., and 2,000 in Japan.

Patients without chronic heart failure and those who respond well to pharmaceutical treatments have a good prognosis. However, the mortality rate rises in patients with anaemia, chromosome abnormalities or a very high white blood cell count.

History
Hypereosinophilic syndrome was first described as a distinct entity by Hardy and Anderson in 1968.

References

External links 
 Hypereosinophilic Syndrome on patient.info
  on eMedicine

Eosinophilic cutaneous conditions
Myeloid neoplasia
Monocyte and granulocyte disorders